Eoophyla myanmarica is a moth in the family Crambidae. It was described by Wolfram Mey and Wolfgang Speidel in 2005. It is found in Myanmar.

References

Eoophyla
Moths described in 2005